Ippolit Feofilovich Kraskovsky (9 December 1845 - ) was a Russian writer. He attended the Saint Petersburg Theological Academy, having moved to Moscow in the 1860s, and wrote short stories for the Moskovskiye Vedomosti newspaper in the 1860s. He later spent roughly a year in Mount Athos, after which he wrote a book entitled Macarius of Athos.

References

19th-century Belarusian writers
1845 births
1899 deaths
People from Grodno Governorate